Shirva is a village in Udupi district India.

Our Lady of Health Church, Shirva
Our Lady of Health Church, which recently celebrated its 100th anniversary, is renowned for its Gothic architecture. The altar had beautiful Roman styled paintings, which were replaced with newer paintings during renovation.

References

Villages in Udupi district